The European Open is a European Tour golf tournament. Founded in 1978, up to 1994 it was played at various courses in England, including Sunningdale and Walton Heath, except for the 1979 event, which was held at Turnberry in Scotland. Between 1995 and 2007 the tournament was held at the K Club in Straffan, Ireland, before moving again in 2008, this time to the Jack Nicklaus-designed Heritage course at the London Golf Club near Sevenoaks, Kent, England. After a five-year hiatus, the event returned to the European Tour schedule in 2015, now played in Germany.

Venues

Winners

Notes

References

External links
Coverage on the European Tour's official site

European Tour events
Golf tournaments in England
Golf tournaments in Scotland
Golf tournaments in the Republic of Ireland
Golf in County Kildare
Golf tournaments in Germany
Recurring sporting events established in 1978
1978 establishments in England